"The Bachelor Party" is a 1953 television play by Paddy Chayefsky which was adapted by Chayefsky for a 1957 film. The play premiered to critical acclaim.

Plot
Charlie Samson is a hard-working married bookkeeper in Manhattan, struggling to advance himself by attending night school to become an accountant. He has just learned his wife is pregnant with their first child, and worries whether he is ready for fatherhood. He and four co-workers throw a bachelor party for a fellow bookkeeper, Arnold Craig, who is about to get married. After watching explicit, short stag films at one member's apartment, they decide to go bar-hopping. Charlie is to be Arnold's best man.

Colleagues attending the party include the older married man, Walter, who has recently been diagnosed with asthma, and Eddie, a happy-go-lucky bachelor. The night becomes a turning point for all five men.

Charlie finds his loyalty to his wife tested during the evening, and he almost has an affair with a young woman he meets on the street heading to a Greenwich Village party. Charlie's young wife at home is also shocked to hear her visiting sister reveal her own husband's extra-marital affairs. Walter, in despair about his situation, wanders off during the evening.

Arnold becomes drunk and ambivalent about getting married, and he breaks off the wedding. He changes his mind after he sobers up and Charlie gives him a lecture about the benefits of married life, despite Charlie's having regretted his own marriage as the story began, and having gone to the party with the serious intention of committing adultery.

We last see Eddie at a bar, striking up a conversation with an older unattractive woman. In the end, Charlie decides that married life is the way to go, and that his struggle to build a home with his wife is worthwhile, and better than the empty and lonely existence of his friend Eddie, whom he used to envy.

Television play

Chayefsky's teleplay was produced by Fred Coe for The Philco Television Playhouse on October 11, 1953. Delbert Mann directed the following cast:

Kathleen Maguire as Helen
Don Murray as Charlie
Bob Emmett as Kenneth
James Westerfield as The Bookkeeper
Joseph Mantell as The Bachelor
Douglas Gordon as The Groom
Anna Minot as Julie
Ely Segall as The Bartender
Elaine Eldridge as The Bar Hag
Walter Kelly as The Young Fellow
Bettye Ackerman as The Girl
Olive Dunbar as The Fiancée

Film adaptation
The 1957 film was directed by Delbert Mann, with Don Murray as Charlie, co-starring E. G. Marshall, Jack Warden and Carolyn Jones. Jones was nominated for the 1958 Best Supporting Actress Academy Award for her portrayal of a party girl who is actually very lonely. Mary Grant designed the film's costumes. Bosley Crowther wrote of the film, "Mr. Chayefsky in his writing and Delbert Mann in his direction of this film have made it delightfully amusing and compensating as it flows. For the most poignant revelations of emptiness and fear, they have provided hilarious explosions in the serio-comic vein."

Cast
Don Murray as Charlie Samson
E. G. Marshall as Walter
Jack Warden as Eddie Watkins
Philip Abbott as Arnold Craig, the Bachelor
Larry Blyden as Kenneth
Patricia Smith as Helen Samson
Carolyn Jones as The Existentialist
Nancy Marchand as Mrs. Julie Samson

Awards
The Bachelor Party was nominated for one Oscar, one BAFTA award, and one award at the 1957 Cannes Film Festival:

Chayefsky on The Bachelor Party
Afterword to The Bachelor Party:

See also
 List of American films of 1957

References

External links
 
 
 
 
 

1953 American television episodes
1953 television plays
1957 drama films
1957 films
American drama films
Black-and-white American television shows
1950s English-language films
Films directed by Delbert Mann
Films produced by Burt Lancaster
Films produced by James Hill
Films produced by Harold Hecht
Films scored by Alex North
Films with screenplays by Paddy Chayefsky
Plays by Paddy Chayefsky
Norma Productions films
Television episodes directed by Delbert Mann
The Philco Television Playhouse episodes
United Artists films
1950s American films